Joseph Rothe (1759 – 18 March 1808) was an Austrian operatic bass singer.

Life 
Born in Česká Kamenice, from 1785 to 1787 Rothe worked at the Viennese court theatres and from 1792 to 1803 he was the tenant of the theatre in Brno. 

Afterwards he moved to the Theater an der Wien. There he sang the role of the jailer Rocco at the premiere of Beethoven's Fidelio on 20 November 1805, as well as at the two performances of the second version of the opera on 29 March and 10 April 1806.

He lived last in Vienna, where he died on 18 March 1808 at the age of only 49 years.

Rothe was married to the singer Clara Rothe (1763-1826), who belonged to the ensemble of the court theatres from 1785 to 1793, then worked in Brno as well as in the Theater an der Wien.

Further reading 
 Johann Heinrich Friedrich Müller, Theatererinnerungen eines alten Burgschauspielers, edited by Richard Daunicht, Berlin 1958, 
 Katalog der Portrait-Sammlung der k. u. k. General-Intendanz der k. k. Hoftheater. Zugleich ein biographisches Hilfsbuch auf dem Gebiet von Theater und Musik. Zweite Abtheilung. Gruppe IV. Wiener Hoftheater, Vienna 1892, 
 Alexander Wheelock Thayer, Ludwig van Beethovens Leben, edited by Hermann Deiters, volume 2, 3rd edition, Leipzig 1922, 
 Willy Hess, Das Fidelio-Buch, Winterthur 1986

References 

19th-century Austrian male actors
18th-century Austrian male opera singers
Operatic basses
1759 births
1808 deaths
People from Děčín District
German Bohemian people
Austrian people of German Bohemian descent